The 2015 Kansas Jayhawks football team represented the University of Kansas in the 2015 NCAA Division I FBS football season. The Jayhawks were led by first year head coach David Beaty. The team played their home games at Memorial Stadium. The Jayhawks finished the season 0–12, 0–9 in conference play. They finished in last place in the Big 12 Conference. Their winless season was only the second time in school history they finished winless, the other time being the 1954 team.

Coaching staff

Schedule

Schedule Source:

Game summaries

South Dakota State

Memphis

at Rutgers

at Iowa State

Baylor

Texas Tech

at Oklahoma State

Oklahoma

at Texas

at TCU

West Virginia

Kansas State

Roster

References

Kansas
Kansas Jayhawks football seasons
College football winless seasons
Kansas Jayhawks football